The 1989 Ohio Bobcats football team was an American football team that represented Ohio University in the Mid-American Conference (MAC) during the 1989 NCAA Division I-A football season. In their fifth and final season under head coach Cleve Bryant, the Bobcats compiled a 1–9–1 record (1–6–1 against MAC opponents), finished in eighth place in the MAC, and were outscored by all opponents by a combined total of 349 to 191.  They played their home games in Peden Stadium in Athens, Ohio.

Schedule

References

Ohio
Ohio Bobcats football seasons
Ohio Bobcats football